Landhe Ke is a village in the Moga district in Punjab in India. It is near to Moga. It is part of municipal council of Moga city as ward no.1 and 50.There is one big gurdwara in the village made in the memories of two Saints who live here. Sant Nagar is situated near this Village.

References

Villages in Moga district